Kulla is a rural locality (a selo) in Batsadinsky Selsoviet, Gunibsky District, Republic of Dagestan, Russia. The population was 31 as of 2010.

Geography 
Kulla is located 19 km southwest of Gunib (the district's administrative centre) by road. Batsada and Shulani are the nearest rural localities.

References 

Rural localities in Gunibsky District